Abby Walker (formally known as Abby Pivaronas) is an American actress and model. She played Vanessa Page on Disney Channel sitcom Jonas.

Life and career 
She was born and raised in Frankfort, Illinois. She went to Lincoln-Way East High School. Walker's other television credits include Gossip Girl, Lincoln Heights, Monk, The Glades and Privileged. She also appeared in the films Mostly Ghostly and the TV film Cheerleader Camp opposite Kristin Cavallari. Walker also appeared in the Funny or Die video Zac Efron's Pool Party.

Filmography

References

External links
 
 

Living people
21st-century American actresses
Actresses from Chicago
Female models from Illinois
American film actresses
American television actresses
People from Frankfort, Illinois
Year of birth missing (living people)